Warren Hale may refer to:

 Warren Stormes Hale (1791–1872), Lord Mayor of London and founder of the City of London School
 Warren Hale (manufacturer) (1811–1893), founder of Hale & Kilburn Manufacturing Company, Philadelphia, Pennsylvania
 Warren Hale (cricketer) (1862–1934), English cricketer